The Tulare Police Department is the police department serving Tulare, California. , the Chief of Police was Wes Hensley.

Overview

Divisions/Units
Patrol Division
Investigation Division
Administrative Division
Animal Services

Fallen officers
Since the establishment of the Tulare Police Department, three human police officers and one police dog have died in the line of duty.

Officers:

K9:

See also

 Law enforcement in California
 List of law enforcement agencies in California

References

External links
 Tulare Police Department

Municipal police departments of California
Organizations based in Tulare, California